Colorado's 32nd Senate district is one of 35 districts in the Colorado Senate. It has been represented by Democrat Robert Rodriguez since 2019, succeeding fellow Democrat Irene Aguilar.

Geography
District 32 covers southern and southwestern Denver.

The district is located entirely within Colorado's 1st congressional district, and overlaps with the 1st, 2nd, 5th, 6th, and 9th districts of the Colorado House of Representatives.

Recent election results
Colorado state senators are elected to staggered four-year terms; under normal circumstances, the 32nd district holds elections in midterm years. The 2022 election will be the first held under the state's new district lines.

2022

Historical election results

2018

2014

2012
Following the resignation of Chris Romer in 2011, appointed incumbent Irene Aguilar ran in an off-cycle election to represent the remainder of his term.

Federal and statewide results in District 32

References 

32
Government of Denver